Öljaren is a lake in Södermanland, Sweden.

References 

Lakes of Södermanland County